Coleophora ogmotona is a moth of the family Coleophoridae. It is found in Sri Lanka (western region, Puttalam) and south-western India (Dharwar plateau).

The wingspan is about 8 mm. The head and palpi are fuscous-whitish. The antennae are stout towards the base and grey obscurely ringed with whitish. The thorax is fuscous, with four whitish longitudinal lines. The abdomen is grey. The forewings are elongate-lanceolate and fuscous, obscurely darker-sprinkled. The veins are marked by slender whitish lines. The hindwings are grey.

References

ogmotona
Moths described in 1917
Moths of Asia